Climate change in Belgium describes the global warming related issues in Belgium. Belgium has the 7th largest CO2 emission per capita in the EU. The CO2 emissions have dropped 19.0% since in comparison with 1990 levels. The average temperature has risen 1.9 degrees Celsius since measurements began in 1890, with an acceleration since 1954.

Greenhouse gas emissions

In 2021, the  greenhouse gas (GHG) emissions were 146.9 million tons of CO2 equivalent (Mt CO2 eq), whose 88 Mt came from the Flemish Region,  54.8 Mt from the Walloon Region and 4 Mt from the Brussels-capital Region.

Targets by region

Flemish Region 

The target of the Flemish Region is a reduction of 5.2% of GHG in the period 2008-2012 compared to 1990. That means average emissions of 83.4 million tons CO2 equivalent in the 2008-2012 period. The 2008–2012, Flemish allocation plan deals with installation consuming more than 0.5 PJ (139 GWh) annually. 17% of GHG emissions comes from transportation and 21 from electricity production and heat production (excluded heat for buildings). There are 178 installations listed.

The largest emitters are, with their emissions in tons of CO2 equivalent (t CO2 eq) per year:
Sidmar owned by ArcelorMittal in Ghent: 8,918,495
Total refinery in Antwerp: 4,323,405
BASF in Antwerp: 2,088,422
Zandvliet Power, a joint venture of BASF and GDF Suez,  in Zandvliet: 1,119,158
Esso refinery in Antwerp: 1,933,000
Fina Olefins in Antwerp: 1,414,550
Electrabel in Herdersbrug: 990,397
Electrabel in Drogenbos: 998,794
E.ON Benelux in Vilvoorde: 828,920
SPE in Ringvaarts: 807,066
Electrabel in Ruien: 730,332
E.ON Benelux in Langerloo: 586,961
Degussa in Antwerp: 526,949

Brussels-Capital Region 

Being a federal state, Brussels-Capital Region also made a second allocation plan for 2008–2012 based on the decree of June 3, 2004 that implements the European directive 2003/87/CE. In that plan, Brussels objective is to have an increase of maximum 3.475% of greenhouse gas emissions compared to 1990.

In 2004, the Brussels-Capital Region emitted 4.4 million tons CO2 equivalent, an increase of 9% compared to 1990 when emissions were 4.083 Mt CO2 eq. The emissions come from domestic use (45%), tertiary sector (25%) and transportation (19%), and energy/industry (2%). The 4.4 Mt CO2 eq do not take into account GHG emission due to electricity production outside the region.

The 2008–2012 allocation plans include only eight facilities:
Audi (former Volkswagen plant) auto production plant in Forest
a BNP Paribas facility (former Fortis)
Bruda plant producing Asphalt
Electrabel turbo-jet power plant in Schaerbeek
Electrabel turbo-jet power plant at Buda
Electrabel turbo-jet power plant owned at Volta
an RTBF television facility
World Trade Center building

Walloon Region 

In the second allocation plan (for the period 2008–2012), the Walloon Region is planning a reduction of 7.5% of GHG emissions compared to 1990 when 54.84 million tons CO2 equivalent was emitted.

The plan for 2008-2012 includes 172 premises. In 2005, the largest emitters were (number in tons CO2 equivalent per year):

CCB cement plant in Gaurain-Ramecroix: 1,515,543
Holcim cement plant in Obourg: 1,508,060
Electrabel power plant in Monceau: 1,260,520
CBR cement plant in Lixhe: 1,059,929
Dumont Wautier Lime plant in Saint Georges: 1,294,087

Other large emitter are cast iron and steel producer in Charleroi and Liège.

On October 22, 2009, BASF announced that they will close the plant located at Feluy at the end of 2009. That plant had a yearly allocation of 36,688 tons of CO2 equivalent.

Mitigation and adaptation

Policies and legislation 
Being a member of the European Union, Belgium, applied the European Union Emission Trading Scheme set up by the Directive 2003/87/EC. The Kyoto protocol sets a 7.5% reduction of greenhouse gas emission target compared to 1990. Belgium set up a National Allocation Plan at the federal level with target for each of the three regions.

On 14 November 2002, Belgium signed the Cooperation Agreement for the implementation of a National Climate Plan and reporting in the context of the UNFCCC and the Kyoto protocol. The first National Allocation Plan was for the period from 2005 to 2007. The European commission approved it on 20 October 2004. The second allocation plan was for the period 2008-2012 and aims a reduction of 7.5% of greenhouse gas emissions compared to 1990.

Paris Agreement

The Paris agreement is a legally binding international agreement, its main goal is to limit global warming to below 1.5 degrees Celsius, compared to pre-industrial levels. The Nationally Determined Contributions (NDC's) are the plans to fight climate change adapted for each country. Every party in the agreement has different targets based on its own historical climate records and country's circumstances and all the targets for each country are stated in their NDC.

In the case of member countries of the European Union the goals are very similar and the European Union work with a common strategy within the Paris Agreement.

See also 
 Plug-in electric vehicles in Belgium

References 

Climate change in Belgium
Belgium